Sir Edward Dering, 2nd Baronet (8 or 12 November 1625 – 24 June 1684) of Surrenden Dering, Pluckley, Kent was an English politician who sat in the House of Commons at various times between 1660 and 1674.

Life

Dering was the eldest surviving son and heir of Sir Edward Dering, 1st Baronet of Pluckley, Kent by his second marriage to Anne, sister of John Ashburnham. He was educated at Heathfield in 1632, Cripplegate, London under Thomas Farnaby in 1633, Throwley under Mr Craig from 1634 to 1637, and Woodford under Mr Copping from 1637 to 1639. He was admitted as a fellow-commoner to Sidney Sussex College, Cambridge in 1640 and transferred to Emmanuel College, Cambridge in 1642 and was awarded BA in 1643. In 1644 he entered Middle Temple. He was 18 at the death of his father, who left a widow and several young children in 1644. He went to Leyden in 1644 and travelled abroad in the Netherlands and France until 1646.

In April 1660 Dering was elected Member of Parliament for Kent in the Convention Parliament. He was appointed one of the six commissioners for executing the Irish Act of Settlement 1662 in July 1662 and was returned to the Irish House of Commons as Member of Parliament for Lisburn.  In 1670 he was elected MP for East Retford in a by-election to the Cavalier Parliament. He was elected MP for Hythe in the two elections of 1679 and in 1681. He was also appointed a commissioner of the Treasury in 1679.

Dering died in London aged 58 and was buried at Pluckley.

Family
Dering married Mary Harvey, daughter of Daniel Harvey (a brother of Dr William Harvey) by Elizabeth, daughter of Henry Kynnersley on 5 April 1648. They had 17 children, of whom 10 survived to adulthood. He was succeeded in his estates and title by his son Sir Edward Dering, 3rd Baronet. Among the other children, Elizabeth was married to Sir Robert Southwell, by whom she is ancestral to Camilla, Duchess of Cornwall; Catherine to Sir John Perceval, 3rd Baronet, by whom she was the mother of John Perceval, 1st Earl of Egmont; Daniel, an Army officer, to Sir John's sister Helena Perceval; and Mary to Sir Thomas Knatchbull, 3rd Baronet.

See also
List of Lord High Treasurers

References

External links
 findagrave.com memorial record
 Parliamentary Archives, Parliamentary diary of Sir Edward Dering and related papers

|-

1625 births
1684 deaths
Baronets in the Baronetage of England
People from Pluckley
Alumni of Emmanuel College, Cambridge
Members of the Middle Temple
Members of the Privy Council of Ireland
English MPs 1660
English MPs 1661–1679
Irish MPs 1661–1666
English MPs 1679
English MPs 1680–1681
English MPs 1681
Members of the Parliament of Ireland (pre-1801) for County Antrim constituencies